The 2015 season of the Women's Super League was the fifth season of the FA WSL, the top-level women's football league of England. The season was played from 25 March to 4 October.

Liverpool were the defending champions from the 2014 FA WSL. Chelsea became the title winners and together with Manchester City (who finished as runners-up) qualified for the 2016–17 UEFA Women's Champions League.

This was the second season since the WSL 2 was introduced. As part of a two-year expansion plan, the WSL 1 will increase to nine teams for the 2016 season. By the end of the 2015 season two teams (Reading and Doncaster Rovers Belles) were promoted from WSL 2 to WSL 1 and only one team (Bristol Academy) relegated to WSL 2, with one team being promoted from Premier League to WSL 2.

Background
In December 2014, the FA WSL announced a two-year plan to expand WSL 1 from an eight to 10-team league. Two teams will be promoted from WSL 2, while one team will be relegated to WSL 2. Also, for the first time, a team from the FA Women's Premier League earned promotion to WSL 2, effectively connecting the WSL to the rest of the English women's football pyramid.

This will leave WSL 1 with nine teams and WSL 2 with 10 teams for the 2016 season, and with the process repeated the following year, both WSL 1 and WSL 2 will have 10 teams each for the 2017 season.

Teams
WSL 1

WSL 2

FA WSL 1 Transfers

Arrivals

Departures

* Natasha Harding was supposed to join American team Washington Spirit, as she was denied a visa, she joined Manchester City instead.

WSL 1

Sunderland earned promotion last season after they won WSL 2 and met off-field licensing requirements. Everton were relegated.

Table

Results

Top goalscorers

WSL 2

Everton were relegated from WSL 1 last season.

Table

Results

Top goalscorers

WSL Cup
All WSL 1 and WSL 2 teams take part. In addition to last season a quarter-final stage was added to the knock-out stage. The first match was played on 21 July 2015, after the WSL break for the 2015 FIFA Women's World Cup.

Group 1

Group 2

Group 3

Knock-out stage

Quarter-finals
Reading are the only WSL 2 team to progress from the group stages. The quarter-finals were drawn on 1 September 2015.

Semifinals

Final

Top goalscorers

References

External links
Official website
WSL Season at soccerway.com
WSL 2 Season at soccerway.com
League Cup at soccerway.com

Women's Super League seasons
1
1
2015–16 domestic women's association football leagues